Fit or FIT may refer to:

Health and medicine 
 Epileptic seizure
 Feature integration theory
 Fecal immunochemical test
 Physical fitness
 Physical attractiveness (colloquial)
 Tantrum

Education 
 Fashion Institute of Technology, in New York City, United States
 Florida Institute of Technology, in Melbourne, Florida, United States
 Fortune Institute of Technology, in Kaohsiung, Taiwan
 Faculty of Information Technology, in Prague, Czech Republic

Entertainment 
 Fitt/fit, a division of Old or Middle English poetry
 Fit (film), a 2010 British film
 FitTV, a cable television network
 Wii Fit, a 2007 video game
 Fit, in contract bridge
 Fit (TV series), a CBBC original series; see 2013 in British television

Mathematics 
 Curve fitting
 Finite integration technique
 First isomorphism theorem
 Five intersecting tetrahedra

Sport
 FIT (Federazione Italiana Tennis)

Technology 
 Fit (manufacturing)
 Engineering fit
 Failures in time, or failure rate
 Flight interception trap
 Framework for integrated test, a software tool
 Google Fit
 Honda Fit, a hatchback

Other uses 
 Direction of fit
 Chrissie Fit (born 1984), American actress
 Feed-in tariff, a policy mechanism designed to accelerate investment in renewable energy
 Filton Abbey Wood railway station, in England
 Federation of International Touch, governing touch rugby
 Fields in Trust, a British environmental organization
 Fitchburg Municipal Airport, FAA LIT code "FIT"
 Flanders Investment and Trade, an agency of the government of Flanders, Belgium
 Forward Intelligence Team, a British police unit
 Fraunhofer Institute for Applied Information Technology, a German research institute
 Freudenberg IT, a German outsourcing provider
 International Federation of Translators, a professional organization
 Meänkieli dialects of the Finnish language
 Workers' Left Front, a political alliance in Argentina
Tantrum
Outfit, as in clothing

See also
 
 
 Fitness (disambiguation)
 Fit-fit, Eritrean/Ethiopian food dish